Hennes bästa was released on 8 June 1998 and is a compilation album from Swedish pop singer Lena Philipsson.

Track listing

CD1
"Kärleken är evig"
"Tänd ett ljus"
"Stjärnorna"
"Dansa i neon"
"Månsken i augusti"
"Om igen"
"Aldrig mer"
"Det går väl an"
"Kärlek kommer med sommar"
"Det är över nu"
"Vila hos mig"

CD2
"Talking in Your Sleep"
"Standing in My Rain"
"006"
"Are You In Or Are You Out"
"Taking Care Day"
"My Name"
"Why"
"The Murder"
"Fantasy"
"Dansa i neon" (Remix 98)

References

1998 compilation albums
Lena Philipsson compilation albums